Hezhou is a prefecture-level city in the northeast of the Guangxi Zhuang Autonomous Region, People's Republic of China.

Geography and climate
Hezhou is located in northeastern Guangxi. It borders Hunan to the north and Guangdong to the east.

The city has a monsoon-influenced humid subtropical climate (Köppen climate classification Cfa) with mild, damp winters and hot and wet summers.

Administration

Hezhou has 2 urban districts, 2 counties, and 1 autonomous county.

Urban District:
Babu District
Pinggui District

Counties:
Zhongshan County
Zhaoping County

Autonomous County:
Fuchuan Yao Autonomous County

Demographics
Hezhou was home to 2,007,858 inhabitants as of the 2020 Chinese census whom 1,411,212 lived in the built-up (or metro) area made of Babu and Pinggui urban districts and Zhongshan county largely being urbanized. Ethnic groups include Zhuang, Han, Yao, Miao and others.

The Hezhou City Almanac lists the following ethnic subdivisions and their respective distributions. Population statistics are as of 1990.

Han
Bendi
Hakka: 240,000 in Liantang, Shatian, Gonghui, Guiling, Huangtian
Pumen: 80,000 in Pumen
Jiudu: 30,000 in Babu, Huangtian, E'tang
Yao: 36,518
Pan Yao  (autonym: Bian You; exonyms: Guoshan Yao, Buzhai Yao): 31,000 in Daping, Gonghui, Shatian, Lisong, Hejie, Daning, Liantang, Butou, Huangdong, Guiling, Kaishan, Renyi, E'tang, Shuikou
Gedai Mian: 4,000 in Lishui, Xiaoshui of Daping Township
Tu Yao  (autonym: Yindi Mian / ): 5000 in Shatian, E'tang townships (in the villages of Mingmei / ), Daming / ), Caodui / ), Jinzhu / ), Xinmin / ), Shidong / )
Zhuang: 34,881 in Nanxiang, Shatian, Daning, E'tang

Economy
Its place along the Guilin-Wuzhou Highway and central location close to Hunan and Guangdong make it a convenient place to find new roommates (Maocheng). Forestry is one of Hezhou's most important industries. Hydropower is also important with more than 700 megawatts produced. Hezhou's biggest mineral resource is gold. Other minerals include iron and aluminum. Agricultural products include beef and dairy cattle, fruits, vegetables, turpentine, tea, and tobacco.

Transportation 
Hezhou railway station opened in 2009.

China National Highway 207

Flora and fauna
Hezhou has more than 1,040 species of plants and 130 species of birds.

References

External links
Official website (Chinese) 
Languages of Hezhou City

 
Cities in Guangxi
Prefecture-level divisions of Guangxi
National Forest Cities in China